The Harris Poll is an American market research and analytics company that has been tracking the sentiment, behaviors and motivations of American adults since 1963. In addition to the traditional consulting offered, Harris has developed software data platforms that allow brands to track health and campaign success. The firm works with clients in three primary areas: brand strategy and tracking,  corporate reputation, and research for public release.

The Harris Poll was started by Louis Harris, an opinion pollster who founded his own firm, Louis Harris & Associates, in 1956. Later rebranded Harris Interactive. The business was acquired from  Nielsen in 2017 by the Stagwell Group, which hired co-Chief Executive Officers John Gerzema and Will Johnson, who relaunched the firm as The Harris Poll. Stagwell Founder and Managing Director Mark Penn also serves as Chairman as well as CEO of MDC Partners. The Harris Poll is headquartered in Chicago and New York City, with additional offices in Washington, D.C., and Rochester, New York.

The Harris Poll runs the longest-standing and largest data set on public opinion research on the coronavirus pandemic in the United States through its COVID-19 Tracker, a biweekly online survey of a nationally representative sample of American adults.

History 
Louis Harris did polling for candidate John F. Kennedy in 1960, as head of the company Harris began in 1956, Louis Harris & Associates. Harris then began The Harris Poll in 1963, which is one of the longest-running surveys measuring public opinion in the U.S., with a history of advising leaders with their poll results during times of change such as John F. Kennedy and Ronald Reagan.

Louis Harris & Associates was bought by Gannett, and then acquired by Gordon S. Black Corporation in 1996, which in 1997 became Harris Black International Ltd., which became a public company in 1999 called Harris Interactive. In the 21st century, it was owned by Nielsen beginning in 2014; then in 2017, Stagwell Group acquired The Harris Poll and the polling company, taking it private. The polling company was relaunched by the Stagwell Group as Harris Insights & Analytics. The Harris Poll has continued through the changes in corporate ownership, its name unchanged.

Louis Harris formed the market research firm of Louis Harris & Associates in 1956. In 1960, Louis Harris & Associates became the first presidential pollster, working for the campaign of John F. Kennedy, who was elected U.S. president that year. The Harris Poll was begun by Louis Harris in 1963 to have a continuing measure of public opinion. In 1970, Harris acquired Humphrey Taylor's firm, where Humphrey was the leading strategist and pollster for the conservative party and for Margaret Thatcher in the UK.

In January 1992 at age 70, Lou Harris retired from Louis Harris & Associates, owned by Gannett Corporation at that time, and formed his second company, LH Associates.

His initial company, and The Harris Poll, was then acquired by Gordon S. Black Corporation in 1996, which in 1997 became Harris Black International Ltd., which became a public company in 1999 called Harris Interactive. In the 21st century, it was owned by Nielsen beginning in 2014; then in 2017, Stagwell Group acquired The Harris Poll and the polling company, taking it private.

Mergers, acquisitions, and sale of business 
The Gordon S. Black Corporation was founded in 1975 in Rochester, New York as a New York corporation. It formed and became part of the Delaware corporation now known as Harris Interactive in 1997. During these years, the company's acquisitions have included:
February 1996 – all of the stock of Louis Harris % Associates, Inc., headquartered in New York.
February 2001 – the custom research division of Yankelovich Partners, Inc., headquartered in Norwalk, Connecticut.
August 2001 – all of the capital stock of Market Research Solutions Limited, a privately owned UK company headquartered in Oxford, England.
September 2001 – all of the capital stock of M&A Create Limited, a privately owned company headquartered in Tokyo, Japan.
November 2001 – all of the capital stock of Total Research Corporation, a Delaware corporation headquartered in Princeton, New Jersey.
March 2004 – all of the capital stock of Novatris, S.A. ("Novatris"), a share corporation organized and existing under the laws of France.
September 2004 – all of the capital stock of Wirthlin Worldwide, Inc. a privately held California corporation headquartered in Reston, Virginia.
April 2007 – all of the capital stock of MediaTransfer AG Netresearch & Consulting, a privately held German stock corporation headquartered in Hamburg, Germany.
August 2007 – all of the capital stock of Decima Research Inc. ("Decima"), a corporation incorporated in Ontario, Canada.
August 2007 – all of the capital stock of Marketshare Limited, a company incorporated under the laws of Hong Kong, and Marketshare Pte Ltd, a company incorporated under the laws of Singapore.
February 2014 – Harris Interactive joins Nielsen.  Nielsen and its wholly owned subsidiary, Prime Acquisition Corp., completed tender offer to buy all outstanding shares of common stock of Harris Interactive, Inc. (NASDAQ:HPOL).  Harris Interactive became a wholly owned subsidiary of Nielsen and its shares ceased to be traded on the NASDAQ Stock Market.
June 2014 – ITWP Acquires Harris Interactive UK, Harris Interactive SAS in France, and Harris Interactive AG in Germany from Nielsen.
January 2017 – The Stagwell Group acquires Harris.

Company leadership
Since its acquisition by The Stagwell Group in 2017, The Harris Poll has been led by Chairman Mark Penn and Co-Chief Executive Officers John Gerzema and Will Johnson. 
Mark Penn, whose career spans 40 years in market research, advertising, public relations, polling and consulting, is president and managing partner of The Stagwell Group, a private equity firm with investments in digital marketing services. Before founding the Stagwell Group in 2015, Penn was chief strategy officer and executive vice president at Microsoft Corp. For six years, he was White House pollster to President Bill Clinton and was a key adviser in his 1996 re-election.  Penn later was chief strategist to Hillary Clinton her U.S. Senate and 2008 presidential campaigns. After graduating from Harvard College in 1976, Penn and his future business partner Doug Schoen started Penn & Schoen  – now PSB Insights - and helped elect more than 25 government leaders in Asia, South America and Europe, including Tony Blair  and Menachem Begin. Penn was also CEO of Burson Cohn & Wolfe, a public relation company owned by WPP Group, from 2006 to 2012. He is the author of “Microtrends Squared: The New Small Forces Driving Today’s Big Disruptions,”  which was published in 2018 and an update to his 2007 book “Microtrends.” Penn has been a columnist for The Wall Street Journal, Time, Politico, The Hill and the Huffington Post. He is a visiting lecturer at Harvard College.

John Gerzema, who began a career in advertising and marketing in 1987, became co-CEO of The Harris Poll in 2017, after almost seven years as chairman and CEO of BAV Consulting, a unit of advertising agency Young & Rubicam, today known as VMLY&R. Previously, he was Chief Insights Officer for Young & Rubicam, which is part of WPP Group. Gerzema is the author of three best-selling books, “The Brand Bubble,” “Spend Shift,”  and “The Athena Doctrine,”  a 2013 exploration of the rise of feminine values in society, leadership and business, which became a New York Times  and Washington Post best-seller. He has given TED Talks and written numerous articles for such publications as the Harvard Business Review and was named ‘Top Management Articles of the Decade’ by Strategy & Business. He keynoted the Milken Global Conference with global research amid the global pandemic in 2020.

Will Johnson was named co-CEO of The Harris Poll in 2017, after a decade as an executive in advertising, marketing and consumer research. Immediately prior to joining The Harris Poll, he was president of BAV Consulting, a Young & Rubicam company, today known as VMLY&R, and chief strategist of BrandAsset Valuator, an analytic survey of brands and consumer behavior. Before that, from 2008 to 2015, Johnson was a senior vice president and director at Young & Rubicam. He presented at the World Economic Forum in 2016 a report on “Best Countries,”  a rating of 80 nations in a partnership with U.S. News & World Report  and the University of Pennsylvania’s Wharton School. Johnson has written for and been quoted in numerous articles for The Washington Post, Harvard Business Review, Fortune, Ad Age, Sports Illustrated, Yahoo Finance, Chicago Tribune, and Crain’s Chicago Business, among other publications.

Chief executive officers
 Gordon S. Black || 1975 – January 2004
 Robert E. Knapp || January 2004 – May 2005
 Gregory T. Novak || May 2005 – October 2008
 Kimberly Till || October 2008 – June 2011
 Albert A. Angrisani || June 2011 – February 2014 
 Will Johnson & John Gerzema || February 2014 – Present

Operations
The Harris Poll works in a wide range of industries, across countries and territories in North America, Europe, and Asia. The firm primarily focuses on leveraging market research methodologies and proprietary models to assist corporations with go-to-market strategies, brand equity management, corporate reputation, and thought leadership. 
The company has been a member of several research organizations, including the US National Council of Public Polls, the British Polling Council, the Council of American Survey Research Organizations, the US Council for Marketing and Opinion Research, and the UK Market Research Society.

As a portfolio firm within The Stagwell Group, The Harris Poll works closely with its sister firms, including:
•	Code and Theory
•	Emerald Research Group
•	Finn Partners
•	Harris X
•	INK
•	Locaria
•	MDC Partners
•	MMI
•	Multiview
•	NRG
•	Observatory
•	SKDKnickerbocker
•	Targeted Victory
•	Wolfgang
•	WyeComm

The Harris Poll engages clients with a brand-tracking platform, market research and brand strategy consulting, omnibus quick-turn polling, corporate reputation consulting, and thought leadership consulting.

References

Further reading
 "Harris Interactive Files Suit Against AOL, Microsoft, Qwest, and other ISPs Over Restraint of Trade"
 "Harris Interactive- Information from Answers.com"

External links

Business services companies of the United States
Companies based in Rochester, New York
Consulting firms established in 1956
Companies formerly listed on the Nasdaq
Market research companies of the United States
Public opinion research companies in the United States
1956 establishments in New York (state)
2014 mergers and acquisitions
2017 mergers and acquisitions